The Valle Sabbia is the second-largest of the Tre Valli Bresciane (Three Brescian valleys), situated in the eastern part of the province of Brescia.

Geography
Physically it constitutes a single valley with Val di Chiese.  It is bounded by Lake Garda to the east, Val Trompia to the west, the Valli Giudicarie to the north and the Pianura Padana to south.  The main approach is on Strada Statale 237 del Caffaro.  It also contains the river Chiese, tributary and outlet of Lake Idro.  Its most populous area is Gavardo, which includes the Valle's hospital.

References
Antonio Fappani, La Campagna garibaldina del 1866 in Valle Sabbia e nelle Giudicarie, Brescia 1970.

External links
Valle Sabbia News—

Sabbia
Province of Brescia
Geographical, historical and cultural regions of Italy